Bolsa Mexicana de Valores, S.A.B. de C.V., also known as Bolsa Group or BMV Group, is a Mexican financial services company headquartered in Mexico City, Mexico. It is the owner and operator of the Mexican Stock Exchange and other financial services companies, such as the custody institution Indeval, the derivatives exchange MexDer, and the market data provider ValMer.

Bolsa Mexicana de Valores reported revenues of US$168 million for 2014. Its main revenues are generated from fees for stock trading, stock maintenance, OTC trading, and custody service.

Bolsa Mexicana de Valores is listed in the Mexican Stock Exchange since 2008 and is a constituent of the IPC, the main benchmark index of Mexican stocks.

References

External links

Bolsa Mexicana de Valores
Companies listed on the Mexican Stock Exchange